The following is a list of works that entered the public domain on 1 January 2022. When copyright expires in a creative work, it enters the public domain. Since copyright terms vary from country to country, the copyright status of a work may not be the same in all countries.

Countries with life + 70 years
With the exception of Belarus (Life + 50 years) and Spain (which has a copyright term of Life + 80 years for creators that died before 1987), a work enters the public domain in Europe 70 years after its creator's death, if it was published during their lifetime. For previously unpublished material, those who publish it first retain the publication rights for 25 years. The list is sorted alphabetically and includes a notable work of the creator's that entered the public domain on 1 January 2022.

Other countries with a copyright term of life + 70 years are Argentina, Brazil, Chile, Ecuador, Uruguay, Peru, Paraguay, Panama, Costa Rica, Nicaragua, Japan, Russia, Indonesia, Israel, Armenia, Burkina Faso, Nigeria, Ivory Coast, Singapore, South Korea, Dominican Republic, Ghana, Madagascar, Mozambique, Senegal, Sri Lanka and Uzbekistan.

{| class="wikitable sortable" border="1" style="border-spacing:0 style="width:100%"
!Names
!Country
!Birth
!Death
!Occupation
!Notable work
|-
| Louis Adamic
| 
| 
| 
| Writer
| Dynamite: The Story of Class Violence in America
|-
| Bartlett Adamson
|  
| 
| 
| Journalist, writer, and political activist
| 
|-
| Jyoti Prasad Agarwala
|  
| 
| 
| Film director, playwright, writer
| Joymoti
|-
| Choudhry Rahmat Ali
| 
| 
| 
| Jurist
| Pakistan Declaration
|-
| Muhammad Ali
|  
| 
| 
| Writer
| 
|-
| Egbert Van Alstyne
|  
| 
| 
| Composer
| "In the Shade of the Old Apple Tree", "Pretty Baby"
|-
| Aram Andonian
|  
| 1875
| 
| Writer
| The Memoirs of Naim Bey
|-
| Leopold Andrian
|  
| 
| 
| Writer
| 
|-
| Henry W. Armstrong
|  
| 
| 
| Composer
| Sweet Adeline
|-
| Numa Ayrinhac
|  
| 
| 
| Painter
| 
|-
| Resurrección María de Azkue
|  
| 
| 
| Writer
| 
|-
| Mohammad-Taqi Bahar
|  
| 
| 
| Poet
| 
|-
| R. H. Barlow
|  
| 
| 
| Writer, anthropologist
|
|-
| Sarah Jane Baines
|  
| 
| 
| Feminist, suffragette, social reformer
| 
|-
| Jacques de Baroncelli
|  
| 
| 
| Film director
| 
|-
| Gaspar Agüero Barreras
|  
| 
| 
| Pianist, composer
| 
|-
| Pramathesh Barua
|  
| 
| 
| Film director, actor, writer
|
|-
| Daisy Bates
|  
| 
| 
| Journalist, welfare worker
|
|-
| Celadet Alî Bedirxan
|  
| 
| 1951
| Writer, linguist
| 
|-
| Frank Weston Benson
|  
| 
| 
| Painter
| List of works by Frank Weston Benson
|-
| Jørgen Bentzon
|  
| 
| 
| Composer
| 
|-
| Konstantin Biebl
|  
| 
| 
| Poet
| 
|-
| Leo Birinski
|  
| 
| 
| Playwright, screenwriter, film director
| 
|-
| Dorothea Foster Black 
|  
| 
| 
| Painter and printmaker
| 
|-
| Algernon Blackwood
|  
| 
| 
| Journalist, writer
| Incredible Adventures, "The Willows", "The Wendigo" and The Doll and One Other
|-
| Thomas Blamey 
|  
| 
| 
| Soldier
| 
|-
| Francisco Boix
|  
| 
| 
| Photographer
| Photographs of Mauthausen concentration camp
|-
| Ivanoe Bonomi
|  
| 
| 
| Politician
| 
|-
| Stephen Bonsal
|  
| 
| 
| Journalist, writer
| 
|-
| Tadeusz Borowski
|  
| 
| 
| Writer, journalist
| 
|-
| Herman Charles Bosman
|  
| 
| 
| Writer
| 
|-
| Alfred-Alphonse Bottiau
|  
| 
| 
| Sculptor
| 
|-
| James Bridie
|  
| 
| 
| Playwright, screenwriter, physician
| 
|-
| Hermann Broch
|  
| 
| 
| Writer
| The Sleepwalkers, The Death of Virgil
|-
| Gelett Burgess
|  
| 
| 
| Writer
| "Purple Cow"
|-
| Abraham Cahan
|  
| 
| 
| Writer
| The Rise of David Levinsky
|-
|Andrew Caldecott
| 
|
|
|Writer and British colonial administrator
|
|-
| Amy Carmichael
|  
| 
| 
| Writer
| 
|-
| John Alden Carpenter
|  
| 
| 
| Composer
| 
|-
| Ethel Carrick 
|  
| 
| 
| Artist
| 
|-
| Émile Chartier
|  
| 
| 
| Writer
| 
|-
| Alphonse de Châteaubriant
|  
| 
| 
| Writer
| Monsieur des Lourdines, La Brière
|-
| Edfwin Cheel
|  
| 
| 
| Botanist, collector
| 
|-
| Peter Cheyney
| 
| 
| 
| Writer
| Lemmy Caution, Slim Callaghan
|-
| Ben Chifley
|  
| 
| 
| Politician
| 
|-
| Cho Ki-chon
|  
| 
| 
| Poet
| 
|-
| Gendün Chöphel
|  
| 1903
| 1951
| Writer, poet
| 
|-
| Al Christie
|  
| 
| 
| Film director
| 
|-
| Halfdan Cleve
|  
| 
| 
| Composer
| 
|-
| Christabel Cockerell
|  
| 1864
| 
| Painter
| 
|-
| Charles Pearce Coleman
|  
| 
| 
| Actor
| 
|-
| Edith Coleman
|  
| 
| 
| Naturalist
| 
|-
| Gustav Cords
|  
| 
| 
| Composer
| 
|-
| Cara David
|  
| 
| 
| Educator, feminist, social reformer
| 
|-
| Wilfrid de Glehn
|  
| 1870
| 
| Painter
| 
|-
| Nirupama Devi
|  
| 
| 
| Writer
| 
|-
| Enrique Santos Discépolo
|  
| 
| 
| Composer, director
| 
|-
| Hans Andrias Djurhuus
|  
| 
| 
| Poet, writer
| 
|-
| Lloyd C. Douglas
|  
| 
| 
| Writer, pastor
| Magnificent Obsession, The Robe
|-
| Georgios Drossinis
|  
| 
| 
| Writer
| 
|-
| Frank DuMond
|  
| 
| 
| Illustrator, painter
| 
|-
| József Egry
|  
| 1883
| 1951
| Painter
| 
|-
| Mário Eloy
|  
| 
| 
| Painter
| 
|-
| Anastasia Eristavi-Khoshtaria
|  
| 
| 
| Writer
| 
|-
| John Erskine
|  
| 
| 
| Writer, composer
| The Moral Obligation to Be Intelligent
|-
| 
|  
| 
| 
| Poet
|  
|-
| Georgy Fedotov
|  
| 
| 
| Writer
|  
|-
| Fei Mu
|  
| 
| 
| Film director
| Spring in a Small Town
|-
| Jerzy Fitelberg
|  
| 
| 
| Composer
| 
|-
| Kristo Floqi
|  
| 
| 
| Playwright, politician
| 
|-
| John Flynn
|  
| 
| 
| Minister, aviator
| 
|-
| Josef Bohuslav Foerster
|  
| 
| 
| Composer
| List of compositions by Josef Bohuslav Foerster
|-
| Robert J. Flaherty
|  
| 
| 
| Filmmaker
| Nanook of the North
|-
| Pietro Frosini
|  
| 
| 
| Musician, composer
| 
|-
| Gao Jianfu
|  
| 1879
| 1951
| Painter
| 
|-
| André Gide
|  
| 
| 
| Writer
| Bibliography of André Gide
|-
| Bert Grant
|  
| 
| 
| Composer
| 
|-
| María Grever
|  
| 
| 
| Composer
| "What a Diff'rence a Day Makes"
|-
| René Guenon
|  
| 
| 
| Philosopher and Sufi Scholar
| The Reign of Quantity and the Signs of the Times
|-
| Jacinto Guerrero
|  
| 
| 
| Composer
| 
|-
| James Norman Hall
|  
| 
| 
| Writer 
| Mutiny on the Bounty
|-
| Ebbe Hamerik
|  
| 
| 
| Composer
| 
|-
| Tamiki Hara
|  
| 
| 
| Writer 
| Summer Flower
|-
| Fumiko Hayashi
|  
| 
| 
| Writer
| Bangiku
|-
| Józef Hecht
|  
| 
| 
| Printmaker, painter
| 
|-
| Sadegh Hedayat
|  
| 
| 
| Writer, poet
| The Blind Owl, [[The Stray Dog (short story collection)|The Stray Dog]]|-
| Thomas N. Heffron
|  
| 
| 
| Film director
| 
|-
| Geoffrey Forrest Hughes
|  
| 
| 
| Aviator
| 
|-
| Herman Hupfeld
|  
| 
| 
| Songwriter
| "As Time Goes By", "Let's Put Out the Lights (and Go to Sleep)"
|-
| Jenő Illés
|  
| 
| 
| Film director
| 
|-
| Ernest Ludvig Ipsen
|  
| 
| 
| Painter
| 
|-
| George Jeske
|  
| 
| 
| Film director
| 
|-
| Tor Jonsson
|  
| 
| 
| Poet
| 
|-
| Gustave-Henri Jossot
|  
| 
| 
| Illustrator, painter
| 
|-
| Robert Kahn
|  
| 
| 
| Composer
| 
|-
| Alfrēds Kalniņš
|  
| 
| 
| Composer
| 
|-
| 
|  
| 
| 
| Archeologist 
| 
|-
| Kim Dong-in
|  
| 
| 
| Writer
|
|-
| Kim Myeong-sun
|  
| 
| 
| Writer
|
|-
| Kitawaki Noboru
|  
| 
| 
| Painter
|
|-
| Tyra Kleen
|  
| 
| 
| Writer
|
|-
| Georg af Klercker
|  
| 
| 
| Film director
| South of the Highway|-
|Katarzyna Kobro
|
|
|
|Avant-garde sculptor
|
|-
| Alexander Krein
|  
| 
| 
| Composer
|
|-
| Kwee Tek Hoay
|  
| 
| 
| Writer
| List of works by Kwee Tek Hoay
|-
| Constant Lambert
|  
| 
| 
| Composer
| List of compositions by Constant Lambert
|-
| Louis Lavelle
|  
| 
| 
| Philosopher
| 
|-
| Ernestina Lecuona
|  
| 
| 
| Pianist, composer
| 
|-
| Henri-René Lenormand
|  
| 
| 
| Playwright
| 
|-
| Sinclair Lewis
|  
| 
| 
| Writer
| Main Street, Babbitt, Arrowsmith|-
| J. C. Leyendecker
|  
| 
| 
| Illustrator
| The Arrow Collar Man
|-
| Heinz von Lichberg
|  
| 1890
| 
| Writer
| "Lolita"
|-
| Ana Aurora do Amaral Lisboa (pt)
|  
| 
| 
| Poet
|
|-
| Benito Lynch
|  
| 
| 
| Writer
| The Caranchos of Florida, The Englishman of the Bones, The Romance of a Gaucho|-
|Richard Malden
| 
|
|
|Biblical scholar, editor, author of ghost stories
|
|-
| Carl Gustaf Emil Mannerheim
|  
| 
| 
| Politician, memoirist
|
|-
| Homero Manzi
|  
| 
| 
| Writer
| 
|-
| Edwin L. Marin
|  
| 
| 
| Film director
| 
|-
| Konstantin Märska
|  
| 
| 
| Film director
| 
|-
| Nellie McClung
|  
| 
| 
| Writer
| 
|-
| Nikolai Medtner
|  
| 
| 
| Composer
| List of compositions by Nikolai Medtner
|-
| Oscar Micheaux
|  
| 
| 
| Writer, director
| 
|-
| Hasrat Mohani
|  
| 
| 
| Independence activist, poet
| 
|-
| Giuseppe Mulè
|  
| 
| 
| Composer
|
|-
| Takashi Nagai
|  
| 
| 
| Writer
| The Bells of Nagasaki|-
| Nam Cao
|  
| 1915
| 1951
| Writer
| 
|-
| Ștefan Neaga
|  
| 
| 
| Composer
| Anthem of the Moldavian Soviet Socialist Republic
|-
| Ndoc Nikaj
|  
| 
| 
| Writer
| 
|-
| Ivor Novello
|  
| 
| 
| Composer 
| "Keep the Home Fires Burning"
|-
| Selim Palmgren
|  
| 
| 
| Composer, pianist
| 
|-
| Pyotr Pavlenko
|  
| 
| 
| Writer
| 
|-
| Scott Pembroke
|  
| 
| 
| Film director
| 
|-
| Brian Penton
|  
| 
| 
| Journalist, novelist
| Landtakers|-
| Felix Petyrek
|  
| 
| 
| Composer
| 
|-
| Andrei Platonov
|  
| 
| 
| Writer
| The Foundation Pit|-
| Ľudmila Podjavorinská
|  
| 
| 
| Writer, poet
| 
|-
| Clara Katharina Pollaczek
|  
| 
| 
| Writer
| 
|-
| Voydan Popgeorgiev – Chernodrinski
|  
| 
| 
| Playwright, writer
| Macedonian Blood Wedding|-
| George Henry Powell
|  
| 
| 
| Songwriter
| "Pack Up Your Troubles in Your Old Kit-Bag"
|-
| Paula von Preradović
|  
| 
| 
| Writer
| National anthem of Austria
|-
| James Peter Quinn
|  
| 
| 
| Painter
| 
|-
| Assen Razcvetnikov
|  
| 
| 
| Writer
|
|-
| Godofredo Rangel
|  
| 
| 
| Writer, translator
|
|-
| Gholamreza Rashid-Yasemi
|  
| 1895
| 1951
| Poet
| 
|-
| Cattamanchi Ramalinga Reddy
|  
| 
| 
| Educator, writer
| 
|-
| Henri Rivière
|  
| 
| 
| Painter
|
|-
| Sigmund Romberg
|  
| 
| 
| Composer
|
|-
| Phil Rosen
|  
| 
| 
| Film director
|
|-
| Georges Hanna Sabbagh
|  
| 1877
| 1951
| Painter
|
|-
| Pedro Salinas
|  
| 
| 
| Poet
| 
|-
| Harry Schmidt
|  
| 
| 
| Mathematician 
| 
|-
| Artur Schnabel
|  
| 
| 
| Classical pianist, composer
| Artur Schnabel's recordings of Beethoven's piano sonatas
|-
| Arnold Schoenberg
|  
| 
| 
| Composer, music theorist
| List of compositions by Arnold Schoenberg
|-
| Percival Serle
|  
| 
| 
| Writer
| 
|-
| Robert Seton-Watson
|  
| 
| 
| Historian
| 
|-
| Levon Shant
|  
| 
| 
| Playwright
| 
|-
| Angelos Sikelianos
|  
| 
| 
| Poet, playwright
| 
|-
| S. Sylvan Simon
|  
| 
| 
| Film director
| 
|-
| Houcine Slaoui
|  
| 1921
| 1951
| Musician
| 
|-
| John Sloan
|  
| 
| 
| Painter 
| 
|-
| Pamela Colman Smith
| 
| 
| 
| Illustrator 
| Rider–Waite tarot deck 
|-
| Henry De Vere Stacpoole
|  Ireland
| 
| 
| Writer
| The Blue Lagoon|-
| Paul L. Stein
|  
| 
| 
| Film director
| 
|-
| Arthur Szyk
|  
| 
| 
| Illustrator
| 
|-
| Abanindranath Tagore
|  
| 
| 
| Painter, writer
| 
|-
| Maila Talvio
|  
| 
| 
| Writer
| 
|-
| Mary Tannahill
|  
| 
| 
| Painter
| 
|-
| Nikoghayos Tigranian
|  
| 
| 
| Composer
| 
|-
| Timrava
|  
| 
| 
| Writer
| 
|-
| Marcel Tournier
|  
| 
| 
| Composer
| 
|-
| Walter Trier
|  
| 
| 
| Illustrator
| Illustration of Emil and the Detectives and Lilliput covers
|-
| Manuel Ugarte
|  
| 1875
| 1951
| Writer
| 
|-
| Jan Valtin
|  
| 
| 
| Writer, covert agent
| 
|-
| Maxence Van der Meersch
|  
| 
| 
| Writer
| 
|-
| Vsevolod Vishnevsky
|  
| 
| 
| Playwright
| 
|-
| Henrik Visnapuu
|  
| 
| 
| Poet
| 
|-
| Will Vodery
|  
| 
| 
| Composer
| 
|-
| Volodymyr Vynnychenko
|  
| 
| 
| Writer, playwright
| 
|-
| Richard Wallace
|  
| 
| 
| Film director
| 
|-
| Jean-Jacques Waltz
|  
| 
| 
| Illustrator
| 
|-
| Nik Welter
|  
| 
| 
| Writer
| 
|-
| Ludwig Wittgenstein
|  
| 
| 
| Philosopher
| Tractatus Logico-Philosophicus, Philosophical Investigations|-
| Wols
|  
| 
| 
| Painter, photographer
|
|-
| Gregorios Xenopoulos
|  
| 
| 
| Writer
|
|-
| Miyamoto Yuriko
| 
| 
| 
| Writer
|
|-
| Corrado Zoli
|  
| 
| 
| Writer
| 
|-
| Hermynia Zur Mühlen
|  
| 
| 
| Writer, translator
| 
|}

Countries with life + 60 years

Countries with life + 50 years
In most countries of Africa and Asia, as well as Belarus, Bolivia, Canada, New Zealand, Egypt and Uruguay, a work enters the public domain 50 years after its creator's death.

Australia

In 2004 copyright in Australia changed from a "plus 50" law to a "plus 70" law, in line with America and the European Union. But the change was not made retroactive (unlike the 1995 change in the European Union which brought some British authors back into copyright, especially those who died from 1925 to 1944). Hence the work of an author who died before 1955 is normally in the public domain in Australia; but the copyright of authors was extended to 70 years after death for those who died in 1955 or later, and no more Australian authors will come out of copyright until 1 January 2026 (those who died in 1955).

Countries with life + 80 years
Spain, Colombia, and Equatorial Guinea have a copyright term of life + 80 years. For Spain this is for creators who died before 1987. The list is sorted alphabetically and includes a notable work of the creator's that entered the public domain on 1 January 2022.

United States

All sheet music published in 1926 entered the public domain. Under the Music Modernization Act, tens of thousands of sound recordings that were published before 1923 entered the public domain on 1 January 2022. The Library of Congress says that this will result in "Increased public and online access to previously unavailable recordings and expanded opportunities to explore the earliest days of our sound recording heritage." Sound recordings that were first published after December 31, 1922, have not yet entered the public domain.

Under the Copyright Term Extension Act, books published in 1926, films released in 1926, and other works published in 1926 entered the public domain in 2022.

Notable books entering the public domain in the United States include The Sun Also Rises, The Murder of Roger Ackroyd, Winnie-the-Pooh, Seven Pillars of Wisdom, and Bambi, a Life in the Woods.

Notable films entering the public domain in the United States include Don Juan (one of the early sound films) and The Son of the Sheik'' (Rudolph Valentino's final film).

Unpublished works by authors who died in 1951 entered the public domain.

See also 
 List of American films of 1926
 List of countries' copyright lengths
 Public Domain Day
 Creative Commons
 Public Domain
 Over 300 public domain authors available in Wikisource (any language), with descriptions from Wikidata
 1950 in literature, 1960 in literature, 1971 in literature

References

External links

 
Popular Books of 1926 at Goodreads

Public domain
Public domain